Wasted Years is the third studio album by the band Off! It was released on April 8, 2014 by Vice Records. As with their previous albums, it features 16 tracks and cover art by Raymond Pettibon.

The band recorded 19 songs at their rehearsal space to analog tape, leaving three off of the album. "In Your Arms" appears as a digital bonus track and a 7", released on Record Store Day 2014, features "Learn to Obey" backed by "I See Through You." The first song from the album, "Void You Out", was premiered by Rolling Stone on January 22, 2014.

'Wasted Years' premiered on the Billboard 200 at #67.

Track listing

Personnel
Band
 Dimitri Coats – guitar, producer
 Steven Shane McDonald – bass guitar
 Keith Morris – vocals
 Mario Rubalcaba – drums

Production
 Raymond Pettibon – artwork

References

2014 albums
Off! albums
Vice Records albums